Ivan Mikalayevich Sadownichy (born 11 May 1987) is a Belarusian professional footballer who plays for Neman Grodno.

Club career
In June 2014, Sadownichy moved to FC Tobol.

International career
He made his debut for the Belarus national football team on 11 October 2021 in a World Cup qualifier against the Czech Republic.

Honours
Kaisar
Kazakhstan Cup winner: 2019

Career statistics

Club

References

External links
 Profile at Neman website
 
 

1987 births
Living people
Belarusian footballers
Association football defenders
Belarus international footballers
Belarusian expatriate footballers
Expatriate footballers in Kazakhstan
Kazakhstan Premier League players
FC Belcard Grodno players
FC Neman Grodno players
FC Vitebsk players
FC Tobol players
FC Shakhter Karagandy players
FC Zhetysu players
FC Kaisar players